Jenifer Martins dos Santos (born 30 June 1989) is a Brazilian Paralympic athlete who competes in international elite competitions, she participates in sprinting and long jump events. She is a triple Parapan American Games champion and has competed at the Paralympic Games three times, her highest achievement is finishing in fourth place in the 100m T38 at the 2008 Summer Paralympics.

References

1989 births
Living people
Sportspeople from Recife
Paralympic athletes of Brazil
Brazilian female sprinters
Brazilian female long jumpers
Athletes (track and field) at the 2008 Summer Paralympics
Athletes (track and field) at the 2012 Summer Paralympics
Athletes (track and field) at the 2016 Summer Paralympics
Medalists at the 2007 Parapan American Games
Medalists at the 2011 Parapan American Games
Medalists at the 2015 Parapan American Games
Medalists at the 2019 Parapan American Games
21st-century Brazilian women